Timothy Duane Stickney (born January 31, 1965) is an American actor, director, and theater practitioner.

Stickney is most recognized for his role as bad guy Randall James "R.J." Gannon on the ABC soap opera, One Life to Live, a role originated in 1994. In 2006, his role as R.J. was bumped down from contract to recurring. He starred in many musicals at Dickinson High School before moving to New York City to attend the American Academy of Dramatic Arts. In 2007, Timothy appeared as Oswald in the Public Theater's production of King Lear and also as Prince Escalus in their "Shakespeare in the Park" production of Romeo and Juliet at the Delacorte Theater in Central Park. Stickney was a member of the Stratford Shakespeare Festival for four seasons. Most recently, Stickney appeared as Macbeth in the Repertory Theater of St Louis' 2011 main stage production.

He directed Shakespeare's classic tragedy King Lear and The Pecong for Take Wing and Soar Productions at the National Black Theater in New York City.

Filmography

External links

American male soap opera actors
American male television actors
American male stage actors
African-American male actors
1965 births
Living people
Male actors from Wilmington, Delaware
21st-century African-American people
20th-century African-American people